White Marsh or Whitemarsh can refer to:
 White Marsh, Maryland, United States
 White Marsh, the location of Sacred Heart Church (Bowie, Maryland)
Whitemarsh Township, Pennsylvania, United States
 Battle of White Marsh, a Revolutionary War battle
 White Marsh, Virginia, a community in Gloucester County

See also

Whitmarsh, surname